Sunglasses is the third single released by Canadian R&B singer-songwriter Divine Brown, from her second album The Love Chronicles (2008). The song samples Corey Hart’s 1984 track, Sunglasses at Night.. A version co-written by and featuring Canadian singer Nelly Furtado was released, along with a version featuring Canadian rapper Kardinal Offishall

Charts

Year-end charts

References

Divine Brown songs
Songs written by Nelly Furtado
2009 singles
2008 songs
Warner Records singles